

1932–1939
 Georgia Carroll
 Elizabeth Gibbons

1940–1949
 Dorian Leigh
 Dina Merrill
 Adele Simpson

1950–1959
 Nancy Berg
 Iris Bianchi
 Barbara Britton
 Carmen Dell'Orefice
 Gita Hall
 Dolores Hawkins
 Dorian Leigh
 Johanna McCormick
 Suzy Parker
 Jean Patchett
 Mary Jane Russell

1960–1969
 Ina Balke (German)
 Candice Bergen
 Monique Chevalier
 Julie Christie
 Wilhelmina Cooper
 Deborah Dixon
 Barbara Feldon
 Agneta Frieberg
 Lucinda Hollingsworth
 Lauren Hutton
 Sue Murray
 Kecia Nyman
 Jennifer O'Neill
 Suzy Parker
 Jean Shrimpton
 Tilly Tizzani
 Veruschka von Lehndorff

1970–1979
 Christie Brinkley
 Kecia Nyman
 Shaun Casey
 Nancy DeWeir
 Susan Forristal
 Shelley Hack
 Veronica Hamel
 Lauren Hutton
 Lena Kansbod
 Evelyn Kuhn
 Catherine Roberts
 Rene Russo
 Cybill Shepherd
 Susan Shoenburg
 Naomi Sims
 Charly Stember

1980–1989

 Paula Abbott
 Donna Alexander
 Kim Alexis
 Kim Basinger
 Monica Bellucci
 Michaela Bercu
 Josie Borain
 Kersti Bowser
 Michele Brooks
 Joan Collins
 Cindy Crawford
 Tara D'Ambrosio
 Janice Dickinson
 Tamara Dobson
 Nancy Donohue
 Linda Evangelista
 Cathy Fedoruk
 Sandra Freeman
 Rebecca Ghiglieri
 Dayle Haddon
 Jerry Hall
 Estelle Hallyday
 Patti Hansen
 Lauren Helm
 Audrey Hepburn
 Clare Hoak
 Rachel Hunter
 Iman
 Kathy Ireland
 Elaine Irwin Mellencamp
 Beverly Johnson
 Milla Jovovich
 Lisa Kauffmann
 Nancy Kerrigan
 Bitten Knudsen
 Tara Krahn
 Cynthia Lamontagne
 Kelly Le Brock
 Cara Leigh
 Susan Lucci
 Karin Lund
 Robyn Mackintosh
 Maki
 Claudia Mason
 Susan Miner
 Liza Minnelli
 Amie Morgan
 Carrie Nygren
 Gail O'Neill
 Carré Otis
 Dolly Parton
 Tatjana Patitz
 Daniela Peštová
 Paulina Porizkova
 Wanakee Pugh
 Kathryn Redding
 Hunter Reno
 Cordula Reyer
 Ashley Richardson
 Annette "Jade" Roque
 Beth Rupert
 Rene Russo
 Carmen San Martin
 Claudia Schiffer
 Joan Severance
 Brooke Shields
 Renée Simonsen
 Alexa Singer
 Talisa Soto
 Linda Spierings
 Sharon Stone
 Fabienne Terwinghe
 Aya Thorgren
 Cheryl Tiegs
 Laurence Treil
 Christy Turlington
 Nastasia Urbano
 Frederique van der Wal
 Rosie Vela
 Louise Vyent
 Rachel Williams
 Oprah Winfrey
 Kara Young
 Sandra Zatezalo

1990–1999

 Halle Berry
 Carla Bruni
 Jenny Brunt
 Naomi Campbell
 Valerie Chow
 Helena Christensen
 Cindy Crawford
 Waris Dirie
 Donna Dixon
 Karen Duffy
 Gail Elliott
 Emme
 Jennifer Flavin
 Daisy Fuentes
 Yasmeen Ghauri
 Florencia Gomez Cordoba
 Melanie Griffith
 Lene Hall
 Katja Halme
 Salma Hayek
 Mariel Hemingway
 Tia Holland
 Susan Holmes
 Lauren Hutton
 Grace Jones
 Melissa Keller
 Sally Kellerman
 Claudia Mason
 Karen Mulder
 Thania Peck
 Bernadette Peters
 The Pointer Sisters
 Jaime Rishar
 Joan Rivers
 Annette "Jade" Roque
 Claudia Schiffer
 Gurus Segovia
 Connie Sellecca
 Nicollette Sheridan
 Gigi Stoll
 Courtney Thorne-Smith
 Christy Turlington
 Shania Twain
 Eva Voorhees
 Estella Warren
 Veronica Webb
 Trisha Yearwood

2000–2009

 Jessica Alba
 Clara Alonso
 Alessandra Ambrosio
 Bianca Balti
 Halle Berry
 Moon Bloodgood
 Veronica Blume
 Kate Bosworth
 Nicola Breytenbach
 Eishia Brightwell
 Ana Carmo
 Sandra Cisa
 Jennifer Connelly
 Luciana Curtis
 Chantal Diguer
 Marybeth DuPain
 Rhea Durham
 Almudena Fernández
 Miriam Fernandez
 Isabeli Fontana
 Daisy Fuentes
 Beau Garrett
 Bridget Hall
 Sierra Huisman
 Carmen Kass
 Liya Kebede
 Melissa Keller
 Jaime King
 Vendela Kirsebom
 Milena Kundicova
 Jennifer Lamiraqui
 Bianca Lawson
 Lucy Liu
 Zuzana Macasova
 Ruza Madarevic
 Heather Marks
 Eva Mendes
 Cherina Montenique
 Julianne Moore
 Sarah Murdoch
 Jade Parfitt
 Rosamund Pike
 Bianca Porcelli
 Minerva Portillo
 Marie Powell
 Caroline Ribeiro
 Pania Rose
 Laura Sanchez
 Susan Sarandon
 Eugenia Silva
 Sarah Thomas
 Daniela Urzi
 Yasmin Warsame
 Erin Wasson
 Rachel Weisz
 Anoek Wielakker
 Liisa Winkler
 Sarah Wynter
 Sonny Zhou
 Leticia Zuloaga

2010–2019

 Jessica Alba
 Belén Bergagna (Latin America only) 
 Halle Berry
 Jessica Biel
 Ciara
 Gal Gadot
 Barbara Garcia
 Ashley Graham
 Marina Jamieson
 Natalia Kozior
 Elle Macpherson
 Bonang Matheba
 Tiffany Pisani (UK only)
 Scandal (Japan only)
 Shanina Shaik
 Olga Sherer
 Gwen Stefani
 Emma Stone
 Elbe van der Merwe
 Anne Vyalitsyna
 Olivia Wilde
 Alejandra Espinoza

2020-Present
 Sofia Carson
 Jessica Jung
 Gal Gadot
 Sdanny Lee (李斯丹妮)

Men featured in Revlon ads
A small number of men have also appeared in Revlon advertising, to promote men's colognes, perform jingles, or pose with spokesmodels, including:

 Bobby Short (performed commercial jingles)
 Mel Tormé (performed commercial jingles)
 Little Richard (performed commercial jingles)
 Nat King Cole (performed commercial jingles)
 Pat Riley (appeared alongside spokesmodels)
 Sugar Ray Leonard (appeared alongside spokesmodels)
 J. Robert Dixon (promoted men's cologne)
 Peter Sellers (promoted men's cologne)
 Tony Randall (promoted men's cologne)
 Paul Newman (promoted men's cologne)
 Don Johnson (appeared alongside then-wife Melanie Griffith)
 Dan Aykroyd (appeared alongside wife Donna Dixon)
 Frank Sinatra (appeared alongside wife Barbara Sinatra)
 Daniel Pimentel (appeared alongside Halle Berry)
 Pharrell Williams (appeared alongside Jessica Biel)

References

Revlon
Revlon